South Wales Fire and Rescue Service (SWFRS) is the fire and rescue service covering the ten Welsh principal areas of Blaenau Gwent, Bridgend, Caerphilly, Cardiff, Merthyr Tydfil, Monmouthshire, Newport, Rhondda Cynon Taf, Torfaen and Vale of Glamorgan.

SWFRS was created in 1996 by the Local Government (Wales) Act 1994, which reformed Welsh local government. It was created by a merger of the previous fire brigades of Mid Glamorgan, South Glamorgan and Gwent.

The fire authority which runs the service is a joint-board made up of councillors from the ten local authorities covered by the service.

Since October 2017, SWFRS has shared its control room with Mid and West Wales Fire and Rescue Service and South Wales Police at the police headquarters in Bridgend,
an arrangement that is expected to save £1million annually across both fire and rescue services.

See also
List of British firefighters killed in the line of duty

References

External links

Fire and rescue services of Wales
Blaenau Gwent
Bridgend County Borough
Caerphilly County Borough
Organisations based in Cardiff
Merthyr Tydfil
Monmouthshire
Newport, Wales
Rhondda Cynon Taf
Torfaen
Organisations based in the Vale of Glamorgan
Organizations established in 1996